William John Oakley (27 April 1873 — 20 September 1934) was an English footballer who, during the Victorian era, played as a full-back for the renowned amateur clubs, the Corinthians and Casuals, and captained the England team once, in a match against Ireland in 1901. In 1894, he was also the English long jump champion.

Early life and education

Born at Shrewsbury, Shropshire, the eldest of five children, Oakley was educated at Shrewsbury School and Christ Church, Oxford. Oakley played football for his school from 1887-1892, captaining the side in his final year, and also rowed for his school. After going up to Oxford, Oakley became President of the athletics club in 1895, representing the university in long jump and 120 yard hurdles.

Club career

Oakley played, in total, 121 games for Corinthian FC, in which he scored just 1 goal. Playing games against all the great professional sides of the era, Oakley was an assured defender whose peak years for the club were the 1898/99 season and the 1899/1900 season, during which he rarely missed a match. He would then play for Casuals F.C.

International career

Oakley made his England debut in a 1-1 draw against Wales during the 1894–95 British Home Championship. He would go on to win a total of 16 England caps between 1895 and 1901, and won his only game as captain against Ireland in the 1900–01 British Home Championship, England winning 3–0.

Cricket

Oakley also played cricket at club level for Shrewsbury and appeared at county level for Shropshire in one match in 1900 when he made 20 runs.

Personal life

He was a close friend of the England centre forward G. O. Smith, with whom he worked as a schoolmaster, and eventually as joint headmaster, of Ludgrove School after retiring from football.

He died at Carlisle, Cumberland, in September 1934 aged 61 following injuries sustained in a road accident.

References

External links

William Oakley's football career at England Player Profile
William Oakley's football career at England Football Online
William Oakley listed among "England's Match Captains 1872-1914" at England Football Online

1873 births
1934 deaths
England international footballers
English footballers
Oxford University A.F.C. players
People educated at Shrewsbury School
Alumni of Christ Church, Oxford
Casuals F.C. players
Corinthian F.C. players
Association football fullbacks